Kalmakareh cave is a cave with historical importance in Lorestan province in the west of Iran. 

This cave is located in Rumeshkan city in Lorestan province. The meaning of the word Kalmakre in the local language is "place of goat (mountain) and figs".

Description

Kalmakre Cave is located in the northwest of Pol-e Dokhtar city. The front of the cave is  ahead of the bottom of its opening, and for this reason, this cave is hidden from view. Kalmakareh was discovered by chance in 1989 by a hunter who was chasing a goat. He discovered a coin in the opening of Kalmakreh Cave, which is a long corridor leading to the main halls, which led to his curiosity and the discovery of the entire treasure. After some time, the Cultural Heritage, Handicrafts and Tourism Organization found out about the existence of such a cave and sent a group to protect it, but all the objects in this cave, which included coins, a number of silver sculptures of animal shapes, and silver cups, were stolen by people. Locals and smugglers had left the cave.

References

Lorestan Province